FCI Levadia U21 Tallinn, commonly known as FCI Levadia U21, is a football club, based in Tallinn, Estonia.

Founded as Levadia Tallinn, it was the reserve team of Levadia Maardu from 2000–2004. In 2004, Levadia Maardu moved to Tallinn and became the new Levadia Tallinn, while the reserve team became Levadia II.

Reserve teams in Estonia play in the same league system as the senior team, rather than in a reserve team league. They must play at least one level below their main side, however, so Levadia U21 is ineligible for promotion to the Meistriliiga but can play in the Estonian Cup. As Levadia Tallinn, the club has won 1 Estonian Cup trophy.

In 2017, Tallinna FC Levadia and FCI Tallinn joined, which resulted in their reserves also joining and becoming Tallinna FCI Levadia U21

Honours
 Esiliiga
 Winners (6): 2006, 2007, 2008, 2009, 2010, 2013

 Estonian Cup
 Winners (1): 2001–02

After winning the Estonian Cup they played in the 2002–03 UEFA Cup.

Players

First-team squad

Personnel

Current technical staff

Managerial history

References

External links
Official website 

 
FCI Levadia Tallinn
Levadia U21
2004 establishments in Estonia
Association football clubs established in 2004